Battle of Blood Island is a 1960 American World War II war film filmed in Puerto Rico and directed by Joel Rapp. It was based on the 1958 short story Expect the Vandals by Philip Roth. Filmgroup released the film, as a double feature with Ski Troop Attack.

Roger Corman appears at the end of the movie as an American soldier.

Cast
Richard Devon as Moe
Ron Kennedy as Ken

Production
Corman put up $31,129.31 of the budget with $14,000 provided by Stan Bickman and Joel Rapp. The movie was shot in Puerto Rico at the same time as two other Corman productions: Last Woman on Earth and Creature from the Haunted Sea.

Corman later said that "it turned out very nicely; it was a good little picture."

See also
Beach Red (1967)

References

External links

1960 films
American World War II films
1960s English-language films
American black-and-white films
1960s war drama films
Films based on short fiction
Pacific War films
Films shot in Puerto Rico
Films set in Oceania
American war drama films
1960 drama films
Films based on works by Philip Roth
Films produced by Roger Corman
1960s American films